Hiroaki Suzuki (Japanese: 鈴木 博昭; born December 6, 1984) is a Japanese shoot boxer and mixed martial artist currently signed to Rizin Fighting Federation. He has also competed for ONE Championship. In shoot boxing, Suzuki is a former SHOOT BOXING World Champion, S-cup World Tournament Champion, and two-time SHOOT BOXING Japan Champion. As of April 2015 he was ranked #6 Featherweight kickboxer in the world by Liverkick.

Kickboxing career

ONE Championship
Hiroaki Suzuki made his ONE Championship debut against Deividas Danyla at ONE Championship: Conquest of Champions on November 23, 2018. Suzuki won by unanimous decision. 

Suzuki next faced Mohammed Bin Mahmoud at ONE Championship: Hero's Ascent on January 25, 2019. He won by third-round technical knockout.

After two consecutive wins, Suzuki was booked to challenge Nong-O Gaiyanghadao for the ONE Bantamweight Muay Thai World Championship at ONE Championship: Warriors of Light on May 10, 2019. Suzuki was dominated for the entirety of five rounds by Nong-O's high volume of right kicks and lost via unanimous decision. 

Following his loss, Suzuki faced Tukkatatong Petpayathai at ONE Championship: Masters of Fate on November 8, 2019. He lost by split decision.

Mixed martial arts career

Rizin Fighting Federation 
Suzuki made his mixed martial arts debut, facing Keisuke Okuda on October 10, 2021 at Rizin Landmark Vol.1. He won the bout via TKO in the first round.

Suzuki faced Kyohei Hagiwara at Rizin 33 - Saitama on December 31, 2021. He lost the bout via unanimous decision.

Suzuki made his third appearance against Shoji Maruyama Rizin Landmark 2 on March 6, 2022. He won the bout via technical knockout due to a punch finished off with soccer kick in the first round.

Suzuki faced Ren Hiramoto in the main event of Rizin 36 on July 2, 2022. He lost the fight by split decision.

Suzuki faced Jin Aoi at Rizin Landmark 4 on November 6, 2022. He lost the bout via unanimous decision.

Titles 
SHOOT BOXING
 2015 SHOOT BOXING World Super Lightweight Champion
 2014 S-cup -65 kg World Tournament Champion
 2014 SHOOT BOXING World Super Lightweight Champion
 2012 SHOOT BOXING World Lightweight Champion
Awards
eFight.jp
Fighter of the Month (November 2013)

Kickboxing record 

|-  
|-style="background:#FFBBBB;"
| 2019-11-08|| Loss ||align=left| Tukkatatong Petpayathai ||ONE Championship: Masters Of Fate||Pasay, Philippines || Decision (Split)|| 3 || 3:00
|-  style="background:#FFBBBB;"
| 2019-05-10|| Loss ||align=left| Nong-O Kaiyanghadaogym ||ONE Championship: Warriors of Light||Bangkok, Thailand || Decision (Unanimous)|| 5 || 3:00
|-
! style=background:white colspan=9 |
|-  style="background:#CCFFCC;"
| 2019-01-25|| Win ||align=left| Mohammed Bin Mahmoud || ONE Championship: Hero's Ascent ||Pasay, Philippines || TKO || 3 || 2:53
|-  style="background:#CCFFCC;"
| 2018-11-23|| Win ||align=left| Deividas Danyla || ONE Championship: Conquest of Champions ||Pasay, Philippines || Decision (Unanimous)|| 3 || 3:00
|-  bgcolor="#FFBBBB"
| 2018-06-08 || Loss || align=left| Fukashi || KNOCK OUT 2018 Survival Days || Tokyo, Japan || Decision (Unanimous) || 5 || 3:00
|- 
|-  bgcolor="#CCFFCC"
| 2018-04-14|| Win ||align=left| Shunsuke Oishi || KNOCK OUT Sakura Burst || Tokyo, Japan || KO (Head Kick)|| 4 || 0:49
|- 
|-  bgcolor="#CCFFCC"
| 2018-02-10|| Win ||align=left| Yuma Yamaguchi || Shoot Boxing 2018 act.1 || Tokyo, Japan || Submission (Standing choke) || 2 || 2:35
|-
|-  bgcolor="#FFBBBB"
| 2017-10-04 || Loss || align=left| Yosuke Mizuochi || KNOCK OUT vol.5 || Tokyo, Japan || TKO (Punches) || 5 || 0:33
|-
|-  bgcolor="#FFBBBB"
| 2017-09-16 || Loss || align=left| Kaito || SHOOT BOXING 2017 act.3 || Tokyo, Japan || TKO (Doctor Stoppage)|| 1 || 2:18
|- 
|-  bgcolor="#CCFFCC"
| 2017-04-08|| Win ||align=left| Hiroto Yamaguchi || Shoot Boxing 2017: Act 2 || Tokyo, Japan || KO (Left Elbow)|| 5 || 2:29
|- 
|-  bgcolor="#CCFFCC"
| 2016-11-11|| Win ||align=left| Hideki || Shoot Boxing World Tournament S-Cup 2016 || Tokyo, Japan || Ext.R Decision (Unanimous) || 4 || 3:00
|- 
|-  bgcolor="#CCFFCC"
| 2016-09-19|| Win ||align=left| Joey Ruquet || Shoot Boxing 2016: Act 4 || Tokyo, Japan || TKO (3 Knockowns) || 1 || 2:32
|-  bgcolor="#c5d2ea"
| 2016-08-07|| Draw ||align=left| Kenta || REBELS 45 || Osaka, Japan || Decision || 3 || 3:00
|-  bgcolor="#CCFFCC"
| 2016-03-26 || Win || align=left| Yuki || RISE 110 || Tokyo, Japan || Decision (Majority) || 3 || 3:00
|-  bgcolor="#FFBBBB"
| 2016-02-13 || Loss || align=left| Tapruwan Hadesworkout || SHOOT BOXING 2016: Act 1 || Tokyo, Japan || Decision (Majority)|| 3 || 3:00
|- 
|-  bgcolor="#FFBBBB"
| 2015-12-01|| Loss ||align=left| Zakaria Zouggary || 30th ANNIVERSARY “GROUND ZERO TOKYO 2015” || Tokyo, Japan || Decision (Unanimous) || 3 || 3:00
|- 
|-  bgcolor="#CCFFCC"
| 2015-08-22|| Win ||align=left| Christian Baya || SHOOT BOXING 30th ANNIVERSARY “CAESAR TIME!” World Super Lightweight Tournament, Final || Tokyo, Japan || Decision (Unanimous) || 3 || 3:00
|-
|-
! style=background:white colspan=9 | 
|-  bgcolor="#CCFFCC"
| 2015-08-22|| Win ||align=left| Rafal Dudek || SHOOT BOXING 30th ANNIVERSARY “CAESAR TIME!” World Super Lightweight Tournament, Semi Final || Tokyo, Japan || Decision (Unanimous)|| 3 || 3:00
|-
|-  bgcolor="#FFBBBB"
| 2015-06-21 || Loss || align=left| Tapruwan Hadesworkout || Shoot Boxing 2015 SB 30th Anniversary|| Tokyo, Japan || Decision (Majority) || 3 || 3:00
|- 
|-  bgcolor="#CCFFCC"
| 2015-04-18|| Win ||align=left| Daniel Romero || SHOOT BOXING 2015 ～SB30th Anniversary～ act.2 || Tokyo, Japan || Decision (Unanimous) || 3 || 3:00
|- 
|-  bgcolor="#CCFFCC"
| 2014-11-30|| Win ||align=left| Zakaria Zouggary || SHOOT BOXING WORLD TOURNAMENT S-cup 2014, Final || Tokyo, Japan || 2nd Ext.R TKO (Punches) || 5 || 2:00
|-
! style=background:white colspan=9 |
|- 
|-  bgcolor="#CCFFCC"
| 2014-11-30|| Win ||align=left| Mosab Amrani || SHOOT BOXING WORLD TOURNAMENT S-cup 2014, Semi Final || Tokyo, Japan || Decision (Majority) || 3 || 3:00
|- 
|-  bgcolor="#CCFFCC"
| 2014-11-30|| Win ||align=left| Pornsanae Sitmonchai || SHOOT BOXING WORLD TOURNAMENT S-cup 2014, Quarter Final || Tokyo, Japan || KO (Left High Kick) || 3 || 2:52
|-
|-  bgcolor="#CCFFCC"
| 2014-09-20|| Win || align=left| Shinsuke Hirai || SHOOT BOXING 2014 act.4 || Tokyo, Japan || TKO || 1 || 3:00
|-
! style=background:white colspan=9 |
|-
|-  bgcolor="#CCFFCC"
| 2014-06-21|| Win || align=left| Lee Sung-hyun || SHOOT BOXING 2014 act.3 || Tokyo, Japan || Decision (Unanimous) || 5 || 3:00
|-
|-  bgcolor="#CCFFCC"
| 2014-04-13|| Win || align=left| Zakaria Zouggary || SHOOT BOXING in TOYOKAWA UNCHAIN.1 || Aichi, Japan || Decision (Majority) || 3 || 3:00
|-
|-  bgcolor="#CCFFCC"
| 2014-02-23|| Win || align=left| Eldrich Torrell || SHOOT BOXING 2014 act.1 || Tokyo, Japan || Decision (Unanimous)|| 3 || 3:00
|-
|-  bgcolor="#CCFFCC"
| 2013-11-16|| Win || align=left| Michihiro Omigawa || SHOOT BOXING BATTLE SUMMIT ～GROUND ZERO TOKYO 2013, S-cup -65kg Japan Tournament Final || Tokyo, Japan || KO (Flying Knee)|| 2 || 1:54
|-
! style=background:white colspan=9 |
|-
|-  bgcolor="#CCFFCC"
| 2013-11-16|| Win || align=left| Yuki || SHOOT BOXING BATTLE SUMMIT ～GROUND ZERO TOKYO 2013, S-cup -65kg Japan Tournament Semi Final || Tokyo, Japan || Decision (Unanimous) || 3 || 3:00
|-
|-  bgcolor="#CCFFCC"
| 2013-11-16|| Win || align=left| Mohan Dragon || SHOOT BOXING BATTLE SUMMIT ～GROUND ZERO TOKYO 2013, S-cup -65kg Japan Tournament Quarter Final || Tokyo, Japan || TKO (2 Knockdowns)|| 2 || 2:17
|-  style="background:#CCFFCC;"
| 2013-09-23 || Win ||align=left| Bovy Sor Udomson || SHOOT BOXING 2013 act.4 || Tokyo, Japan || Decision (Unanimous) || 3 || 3:00
|-
|-  bgcolor="#CCFFCC"
| 2013-06-23|| Win || align=left| Shunichi Shimizu || SHOOT BOXING 2013 act.3 || Tokyo, Japan || Decision (Unanimous) || 3 || 3:00
|-
|-  bgcolor="#FFBBBB"
| 2013-04-20|| Loss || align=left| Mohan Dragon || SHOOT BOXING 2013 act.2 || Tokyo, Japan || KO (Right hook) || 1 || 2:51
|-
|-  bgcolor="#CCFFCC"
| 2012-11-17|| Win || align=left| Joachim Hansen || SHOOTO BOXING WORLD TOURNAMENT S-cup 2012 || Tokyo, Japan || Ext.R Decision (Unanimous) || 4 || 3:00
|-
|-  bgcolor="#CCFFCC"
| 2012-06-03|| Win || align=left| Hiroki Shishido || SHOOT BOXING 2012 ～Road to S-cup～ act.3 || Tokyo, Japan || Decision (Unanimous) || 5 || 3:00
|-
|-  bgcolor="#CCFFCC"
| 2012-04-13|| Win || align=left| Takeshi Inoue || SHOOT BOXING 2012～Road to S-cup～act.2 || Tokyo, Japan || KO (Right hook) || 3 || 3:00
|-
|-  bgcolor="#CCFFCC"
| 2012-02-12|| Win || align=left| Yuuji Sagawara || SHOOT BOXING 2012 Young Caesar Cup Central #3 || Tokyo, Japan || Decision (Unanimous)|| 3 || 3:00
|-
! style=background:white colspan=9 |
|-
|-  bgcolor="#CCFFCC"
| 2011-11-06|| Win || align=left| Akiyo Nishiura || SHOOT the SHOOTO 2011	 || Tokyo, Japan || Decision (Unanimous)|| 3 || 3:00
|-
|-  bgcolor="#CCFFCC"
| 2011-04-23|| Win || align=left| Kim Hu || SHOOTO BOXING 2011 act.2 -SB168- || Tokyo, Japan || Decision (Unanimous)|| 3 || 3:00
|-
|-  bgcolor="#CCFFCC"
| 2011-02-19|| Win || align=left| Shigeki Osawa || SHOOTO BOXING 2011 act.1 -SB166-  || Tokyo, Japan || Decision (Unanimous)|| 3 || 3:00
|-
|-  bgcolor="#CCFFCC"
| 2010-11-23|| Win || align=left| Mitsuhiro Ishida || Shoot Boxing World Tournament 2010  || Tokyo, Japan || KO (Left cross)|| 2 || 2:20
|-
|-  bgcolor="#FFBBBB"
| 2010-09-18|| Loss || align=left| Tapruwan Hadesworkout || SHOOT BOXING 25TH ANNIVERSARY SERIES -ISHIN- 4 || Tokyo, Japan || Decision (Majority)|| 5 || 3:00
|-
|-  bgcolor="#CCFFCC"
| 2010-06-06|| Win || align=left| Tenkei Fujimiya || SHOOT BOXING 25TH ANNIVERSARY SERIES -ISHIN- 3 || Tokyo, Japan || Ext.R Decision (Split) || 4 || 3:00
|-
|-  bgcolor="#CCFFCC"
| 2010-04-11|| Win || align=left| Akifumi Utagawa || SHOOT BOXING 25TH ANNIVERSARY SERIES -ISHIN- 2 || Tokyo, Japan || Decision || 3 || 3:00
|-
|-  bgcolor="#CCFFCC"
| 2010-02-13|| Win || align=left| Koji Isahikawa || SHOOT BOXING 25TH ANNIVERSARY SERIES -ISHIN- 1 || Tokyo, Japan || KO (Right hook) || 1 || 1:06
|-
|-  bgcolor="#FFBBBB"
| 2009-09-04|| Loss || align=left| Tomohiro Oikawa || SHOOT BOXING 2009 -bushido- 4 || Tokyo, Japan || Decision (Unanimous)|| 5 || 3:00
|-
! style=background:white colspan=9 |
|-
|-  bgcolor="#CCFFCC"
| 2009-06-01|| Win || align=left| Tomohiro Oikawa || SHOOT BOXING 2009 -bushido- 3  || Tokyo, Japan || KO (Punches) || 3 || 3:00
|-
|-  bgcolor="#CCFFCC"
| 2009-04-03|| Win || align=left| Akifumi Utagawa || SHOOT BOXING 2009 -bushido- 2  || Tokyo, Japan || Decision (Unanimous)|| 3 || 3:00
|-
|-  bgcolor="#CCFFCC"
| 2009-02-11|| Win || align=left| Kouya Shimada || SHOOT BOXING 2009 -bushido- 1  || Tokyo, Japan || Decision (Unanimous)|| 3 || 3:00
|-
|-  bgcolor="#CCFFCC"
| 2008-10-25|| Win || align=left| Masahiro Knuckle Kida || SHOOT BOXING 2008 Young Caesar OSAKA || Osaka, Japan || KO || 2 || 2:41
|-
|-  bgcolor="#CCFFCC"
| 2008-09-12|| Win || align=left| Yoshiki Harada || SHOOT BOXING 2008 火魂〜Road to S-cup〜 5 || Tokyo, Japan || Decision (Unanimous)|| 3 || 2:00
|-
|-  bgcolor="#CCFFCC"
| 2008-07-21|| Win || align=left| Tatsumi Yuda || SHOOT BOXING 2008 火魂〜Road to S-cup〜 4 || Tokyo, Japan || Decision (Unanimous)|| 3 || 2:00
|-
|-  bgcolor="#FFBBBB"
| 2008-05-28|| Loss || align=left| Yasuhiro Motomura || SHOOT BOXING 2008 火魂〜Road to S-cup〜 3 || Tokyo, Japan || TKO (3 Knockdowns)|| 2 || 0:55
|-
|-  bgcolor="#CCFFCC"
| 2008-03-30|| Win || align=left| Gaku Sakai || HEAT 6 || Nagoya, Japan || TKO (Corner stoppage) || 2 || 0:55
|-
| colspan=9 | Legend:

Mixed martial arts record

|-
|Loss
|align=center| 2–3
|Jin Aoi
|Decision (unanimous)
|Rizin Landmark 4
|
|align=center|3
|align=center|5:00
|Nagoya, Japan
|
|-
|Loss
|align=center| 2–2
|Ren Hiramoto
|Decision (split)
|Rizin 36
|
|align=center|3
|align=center|5:00
|Okinawa, Japan
|
|-
| Win
| align=center| 2–1
| Shoji Maruyama
| TKO (punch and soccer kick)
| Rizin Landmark 2
| 
| align=center|1
| align=center|1:12
| Fukuroi, Japan
|-
|Loss
|align=center|1–1
|Kyohei Hagiwara
|Decision (unanimous)
|Rizin 33
|
|align=center|3
|align=center|5:00
|Saitama, Japan
|
|-
|Win
|align=center| 1–0
|Keisuke Okuda
|TKO (knee and punches)
|Rizin Landmark Vol.1
|
|align=center|1
|align=center|1:42
|Tokyo, Japan
|

See also 
List of male kickboxers

References

1997 births
Living people
Japanese male kickboxers
Japanese male karateka
Japanese male mixed martial artists
Mixed martial artists utilizing karate
Mixed martial artists utilizing shootboxing
ONE Championship kickboxers
People from Aichi Prefecture